is Japanese idol group AKB48's eighth single,  and the sixth major single released through DefSTAR Records, on October 31, 2007. Although it reached only number 10 on the Oricon charts, it is considered one of the group's favorite songs.

Promotion
The title track was sung with only ten members, the least number since the  process was introduced for the group. Four members who had sung on the group's previous single, "Boku no Taiyō", were not chosen. "Yūhi o Miteiru ka?" was the third single released within four months since "BINGO!"'s release, and the fifth single released in 2007.

Music clip of "Yūhi o Miteiru ka?" was filmed by Eiki Takahashi, who filmed a music clip of "Keibetsu Shiteita Aijō. Outdoor scenes were filmed in Nagano Prefecture, including Yagisawa Station of Ueda Electric Railway Bessho Line.

Members

Yūhi o Miteiru ka?
The title track was sung by the following members:
 Team A: Tomomi Itano, Haruna Kojima*, Atsuko Maeda*, Minami Minegishi, Minami Takahashi
 Team K: Tomomi Kasai*, Sae Miyazawa*, Erena Ono, Yuko Oshima
 Team B: Mayu Watanabe*

The center performers for the single were Haruna Kojima and Atsuko Maeda.

Reception
The single charted only 3 weeks in the top 200 with the highest rank at number 10. "Yūhi o Miteiru ka?"  only sold 18,429 copies, the lowest performing single to date., although Yasushi Akimoto assumed it as his best song before releasing it and he and many AKB48 members claim it as their favorite song in the AKB48 repertoire.

Track listing

Charts

JKT48 version

An Indonesian version of the song, "Yuuhi wo miteiru ka? -Apakah Kau Melihat Mentari Senja?-", was released on July 3, 2013 by AKB48's sister group JKT48. It would mark the group's second single release, as well as the first single that involved the newly formed Team KIII.

Release 
The single has two versions: Regular Edition (CD+DVD) and Theater Edition (CD only).  The Regular Edition contained a photo. The first ten thousand CDs contained a special photo of Team KIII. The Theater Edition came with a trump card and a handshake ticket.

Track listing

Regular Edition

Theater Edition

JKT48 Personnel

"Yuuhi wo miteiru ka? -Apakah Kau Melihat Senja?-" 
Center: Jessica Veranda
 Team J: Haruka Nakagawa, Jessica Veranda, Melody Nurramdhani Laksani, Nabilah Ratna Ayu Azalia, Shania Junianatha
 Team KIII: Cindy Yuvia, Natalia, Ratu Vienny Fitrilya, Rona Anggreani, Shinta Naomi

" Nagai Hikari- Cahaya Panjang -" 
 Team J: Aki Takajo, Ayana Shahab, Beby Chaesara Anadila, Cindy Gulla, Devi Kinal Putri, Gabriela Margareth Warouw, Ghaida Fairsya, Haruka Nakagawa, Jessica Vania, Jessica Veranda, Melody Nurramdhani Laksani, Nabilah Ratna Ayu, Rena Nozawa, Rezky Wiranti Dhike, Sendy Ariani, Shania Junianatha

"1! 2! 3! 4! Yoroshiku!" 
 Team KIII: Alicia Chanzia, Cindy Yuvia, Della Delila, Intar Putri Kariina, Jennifer Hanna, Lidya Maulida Djuhandar, Nadila Cindy Wantari, Natalia, Noella Sisterina, Ratu Vienny Fitrilya, Riskha Fairunissa, Rona Anggreani, Shinta Naomi, Sinka Juliani, Thalia, Viviyona Apriani

"Viva! Hurricane" 
 Team KIII: Alicia Chanzia, Cindy Yuvia, Della Delila, Intar Putri Kariina, Jennifer Hanna, Lidya Maulida Djuhandar, Nadila Cindy Wantari, Natalia, Noella Sisterina, Ratu Vienny Fitrilya, Riskha Fairunissa, Rona Anggreani, Shinta Naomi, Sinka Juliani, Thalia, Viviyona Apriani

References

External links
 JKT48 Discography 
 Yuuhi wo miteiru ka? -Apakah Kau Melihat Mentari Senja?- Special page 

AKB48 songs
JKT48 songs
2007 singles
Songs with lyrics by Yasushi Akimoto
Defstar Records singles
2007 songs